"I Wanna Wake Up with You" is a song written by Nashville songwriter Ben Peters. It was first recorded by American country music artist and actor Mac Davis and released in March 1980, and then by American country music singer Con Hunley in September that year, with both versions titled as "I Wanta Wake Up With You".

In 1986, veteran reggae artist Boris Gardiner covered this song as "I Want to Wake Up with You" (or sometimes titled as "I Wanna Wake Up with You").  Gardiner's version went to No. 1 on the UK Singles Chart for three weeks in August 1986. It was the third best-selling single of 1986 in the UK.  It also reached number 1 in Australia. and number 3 in South Africa, spending 18 weeks on the charts. The music video for the song was filmed at various locations in West London, including Westbourne Park tube station, and Holland Park. Gardiner is also seen riding in a taxi along the Westway.

The song has subsequently been covered by Cristy Lane, Johnny Rodriguez, John Holt Erann DD and Engelbert Humperdinck.

Charts

Weekly Charts

Year-end charts

References 

1986 singles
1986 songs
UK Singles Chart number-one singles
Number-one singles in Australia
Lovers rock songs
Johnny Rodriguez songs
Cristy Lane songs
Songs written by Ben Peters